Sukhada Pandey is a leader of the Bharatiya Janata Party and minister of Youth Art And Culture in the Government of Bihar in India. She is also the vice president of the national party.

She is from a Brahmin family and is married into a Kanyakubja Brahmin family. She is the retired principal of Magadh Mahila College (Patna University).

References

Bihari politicians
Women in Bihar politics
Living people
Bharatiya Janata Party politicians from Bihar
21st-century Indian women politicians
21st-century Indian politicians
Year of birth missing (living people)